Società Sportiva Dilettantistica Acireale Calcio 1946 is an Italian association football club, based in Acireale, a city of 57,000 inhabitants 18 km away from Catania in Sicily. The club currently plays in Serie D, although they have played for two seasons in Serie B.

History

Foundation
The club's roots can be traced back to a previous club in the city, from whose ashes the current incarnation rose from; the older club in the city played between 1928 and 1935.

The club was founded in 1946 as A.C. Acireale, making its debut in Serie C.

The team reached its culmination in 1992/1993 when, after a long period played in Serie C1, C2 and D, the team, coached by Giuseppe Papadopulo, surprisingly gained its first promotion to Serie B. During its first Serie B season in 1993/1994, Acireale avoided relegation after having won a play-off against Pisa Calcio on penalties. But, in its next season, Acireale was not able to repeat their feat, and were relegated to Serie C1. Acireale successively played consecutively four season in Serie C2, a period which ended in 2003 after being promoted on playoffs. However, after a disappointing Serie C1 season in 2005/2006, ended with a relegation to Serie C2, Acireale dropped because of financial troubles.

The refoundation

A new property registered the club as Acireale Calcio to the Promozione regional league, the 7th level in the Italian football league system. In its first Promozione season, the club readily won its league round being thus promoted to Eccellenza. The club was renamed to the current denomination in August 2007, and will take part to the Sicilian Group B of Eccellenza in 2007–2008, obtaining the promotion in the season 2009–10 to Serie D.

Notable former managers
 Walter Mazzarri
 Giuseppe Papadopulo
 Francesco Scoglio

External links

Official homepage

 
Football clubs in Italy
Football clubs in Sicily
Association football clubs established in 1946
Serie B clubs
Serie C clubs
1946 establishments in Italy
2006 establishments in Italy
2014 establishments in Italy
Serie D clubs
Phoenix clubs (association football)